Sturgeon Lake may refer to:

Canada 
Sturgeon Lake (Alberta), a lake in Alberta, west of Valleyview
Ontario
Sturgeon Lake (north Kenora District), a lake in northwestern Ontario, in northern Kenora District in the Hayes River watershed 
Sturgeon Lake (Northwestern Ontario), a lake in northwestern Ontario, in eastern Kenora and north-western Thunder Bay Districts
Sturgeon Lake (Nipissing District), a lake in northeastern Ontario, in Nipissing District
Sturgeon Lake (Ontario), a lake in southern Ontario in the Kawartha Lakes region
Sturgeon Lake Caldera, a caldera in northwestern Ontario
Sturgeon Lake (Rainy River District), a lake of the Hunter Island region of Quetico Provincial Park, northwestern Ontario
Sturgeon Lake (Saskatchewan), a lake northwest of Prince Albert, Saskatchewan
First Nations
Sturgeon Lake First Nation, a First Nation whose territory borders the lake of the same name in Saskatchewan

United States 
Sturgeon Lake (Michigan), a lake in Michigan on the St. Joseph River
Sturgeon Lake, Minnesota, a city in Minnesota 
Sturgeon Lake (Goodhue County, Minnesota), a natural lake
Sturgeon Lake (Oregon), a lake on Sauvie Island in Oregon

See also
Sturgeon